"The Grace" is a song written by Canadian recording artist and producer Daniel Victor in August 2005 and appears on the Neverending White Lights' debut album, Act 1: Goodbye Friends of the Heavenly Bodies.

Background
The song was written with the intent of using Canadian singer/performer Dallas Green (of Alexisonfire and City and Colour) as the featured vocalist.  In a last-minute attempt to lift the sound of the album, Victor came up with "The Grace" during a late-night writing session, only a month before the album went into stores. After capturing Dallas Green's vocal parts in Toronto, Ontario, the song was promptly mixed and released in Canada.

Every instrument and part in the song was performed and recorded by Daniel Victor in his home studio in Windsor, Ontario, Canada (except for the violin parts). Commenting on the song's name, Victor stated that "...it's about someone's thoughts that dying could be a positive thing, a good transition to get away from the world...and the person in the song is trying to figure out where he really belongs in this world with the help of his angels..."[quoted from an e-mail reply written to a fan]. Themes of life and death are the main focus of Victor's debut album, and this song is no exception. Its original title was "The Grace of a Happy Death".

Chart performance
As the first single from the album, it received extensive radio play across the country, eventually charting #3 on Rock Radio and #1 on the Rock Audience Chart. It also reached #1 on many popular radio station countdowns including Edge 102 in Toronto (for 2 weeks).

Music video
The music video is a cinematic blue-tinged love story between a man (played by Victor) and a fallen angel (played by musician Emm Gryner) in the Victorian era. It hit #1 on MuchMusic in April 2006, and on MuchMoreMusic for two weeks that same month. "The Grace" essentially launched Neverending White Lights into the Canadian spotlight.

The video starts off with glimpses of statues of angels, and a camera clicking as they are filmed. It then leads to a scene of Victor mending the wings of a fallen angel in his home. As he sews the feathers in, a long and painful process, tears roll down the angel's cheeks. Victor wipes them off gently with a feather. Over the next few days as he finishes his work, plays music to her, and shows her the film of the statues he'd taken earlier, it is evident he falls in love with her. Each day the angel puts on a white pendant with the figure of a woman on it, and Victor shows her a good time. But at last, Victor's work is done, and the grateful angel, with her new wings, touches his face gingerly before disappearing. She leaves the pendant behind. Heartbroken, Victor commits suicide, and the angel reappears then and stays by his side, grieving as the song ends with one final piano note.

References 

2005 songs